Dasht is a town and tehsil of Kharan District in the Balochistan province of Pakistan. The town is located at 28°36'30N 66°18'50E with an altitude of 1796 metres (5895 feet). The population of the tehsil as a whole was 58,621 in 1998.

Incidents
 2022 Kech district attack

References

Populated places in Kharan District